Kaguru (Kagulu) is a Bantu language of the Morogoro and Dodoma regions of Tanzania. It is closely related to Gogo and Zaramo, but is not intelligible with other languages.

References

Further reading

  Accessed 12 Jan. 2023.
 
  Accessed 12 Jan. 2023.

External links
Grammar of the Kagúru language By J T. Last (1886)

Languages of Tanzania
Northeast Coast Bantu languages